Atlètic de Ciutadella is a football team based in Ciutadella, Illes Balears. Founded in 1956, the team did not play in any category from 2010 to 2012, returning to football activity for 2012–13 season.

The club's home ground is Estadio Sant Antoni.

The club was established in 1956 through a merger of CD Ciudadela and CD Minerva Ciudadela.

Season to season

38 seasons in Tercera División

Former players
 Martín Prest
 Diego Balbinot

References

External links
official website

Football clubs in the Balearic Islands
Sport in Menorca
Association football clubs established in 1956
Divisiones Regionales de Fútbol clubs
1956 establishments in Spain